The Walt Whitman Houses are a housing project in Fort Greene neighborhood of Brooklyn, New York completed on February 24, 1944. The project consists of fifteen buildings, 6 and 13-stories tall with 1,659 apartment units. It covers a 18.44-acre expanse, and is bordered by St. Edward's Street, and Park, Carlton and Myrtle Avenues. It is owned and managed by New York City Housing Authority (NYCHA).

The development was named after the 19th century poet Walt Whitman, who lived and worked in Brooklyn.

Notable residents 

 Ol' Dirty Bastard (1968–2004), rapper
 Dana Dane (born 1965), rapper
 Bernard King (born 1956), former NBA player

See also 
New York City Housing Authority
List of New York City Housing Authority properties

References 

Public housing in Brooklyn
1944 establishments in New York City
Residential buildings completed in 1944
Fort Greene, Brooklyn